The Young England women's cricket team was a team that played in the 1973 Women's Cricket World Cup. They were an Under 25 side, playing in addition to the senior England team. They finished last in the seven team tournament, their only win coming against International XI.

History
Young England were formed to compete in the 1973 Women's Cricket World Cup, "making up the numbers" along with International XI after South Africa was not invited due to apartheid. The side was captained by Susan Goatman.

Young England's first match of the tournament was against Australia, in which they were bowled out for just 57 and losing by 7 wickets. They also lost their second game, against Jamaica, by 23 runs. They gained their first win of the tournament in their third match, posting 165/7 from their 60 overs against International XI before restricting their opposition to 151/8 to win by 14 runs. Young England batter Geraldine Davies made 65, whilst Julia Greenwood and Rosalind Heggs took 3 wickets apiece. This would prove to be Young England's only win of the tournament, however, as they went on to lose to Trinidad and Tobago, England and New Zealand in their final three matches. Overall, the side finished bottom of the seven team group.  Young England bowler Rosalind Heggs was the leading wicket-taker in the competition, with 12 wickets at an average of 14.91.

Tournament history

Women's Cricket World Cup
 1973: 7th

Records

One-Day Internationals
Highest team total: 174/6 vs New Zealand, 21 July 1973.
Highest individual score: 65, Geraldine Davies vs International XI, 7 July 1973.
Best innings bowling: 4/8, Glynis Hullah vs Jamaica, 30 June 1973.

See also
List of Young England women ODI cricketers
England women's cricket team

References

C
1973 establishments in England
1973 Women's Cricket World Cup